This article lists the winners and nominees for the NAACP Image Award for Outstanding Documentary.

History
This award was first given in 2008, before being discontinued after the 2009 ceremony. The award returned during the 2017 ceremony, this time honoring film and television documentaries separately.

Winners and nominees
Winners are listed first and highlighted in bold.

2000s

2010s

Film

Television

2020s

Film

Television

Footnotes
≠ indicates an Academy Award for Best Documentary Feature nomination
± indicates an Academy Award for Best Documentary Feature win

References

NAACP Image Awards
American documentary film awards